Peanut pie, sometimes called the "poor man's pecan pie", is a pie that is part of the cuisine of the Southern United States, in the Tidewater region, where peanuts are a common crop. It can be served as a kosher dessert. In North Carolina it was a standard dish to serve at family reunions or church events.

Origins
The peanut's origins have been traced to Peru. It was brought to Europe by the Spanish, and then spread to Africa and Asia. It arrived in North America in the 18th century with African slaves. Peanut pie was originally considered slave food, but by the 1940s peanuts were widely consumed, and an advertisement for corn syrup (used to make the sweet, sticky pie filling) claimed that peanut pies could “make even your deepest-dyed Yankee start complimenting you with a southern accent.” The pie was popular in Virginia and North Carolina.

Preparation
The sweet filling is made from corn syrup, sugar and eggs, similar to how pecan pie filling is prepared. Molasses, sorghum, pure cane syrup or maple syrup are sometimes used in place of corn syrup. Some recipes include heavy cream or cream cheese in the filling, while others may include chocolate, cayenne pepper, cinnamon, nutmeg or bourbon. The finished pie is served warm and may be topped with whipped cream, a dessert sauce or served à la Mode. It can be made as individual mini-pies and frozen.

See also

 Cashew pie
 Chestnut pie
 List of peanut dishes
 List of pies, tarts and flans
 Pecan pie
 Walnut pie

References

American pies
Peanut dishes
Sweet pies